Adam-lès-Passavant (literally Adam near Passavant) is a commune in the Doubs department in the Bourgogne-Franche-Comté region in eastern France.

Population
The inhabitants of Adam-lès-Passavant are known as Adams.

See also
 Communes of the Doubs department

References

Communes of Doubs